Rega Research Ltd. is a British audio equipment manufacturer. Rega was founded in 1973. The company's name was formed of the initials of its two founders (RElph & GAndy). Rega are widely known for their turntables – most notably the iconic Rega Planar 3, cartridges and tonearms, and has produced award-winning amplification and speakers for over 20 years. In addition to manufacturing products under their own brand name, they have also served as an original equipment manufacturer of turntables and tonearms for other companies such as NAD and Rotel.

Rega Research is imported and distributed in the US by The Sound Organisation, based in Arlington, Texas.

History
In addition to making its own brand products, Rega is an OEM supplier. For example, Rega arms or variants are found in numerous other audiophile turntables. It also manufactured a slightly modified version of its Planar 2 with a RB250 arm for NAD that was marketed under the NAD533 model number.

In 2014, Rega maintains a custom-built factory and has 90 to 100 employees. It has no marketing department, but produces every model in the UK and some in Asia, and tries to maintain UK-based parts suppliers as well. The only advertisement Rega ever ran  was to say that it didn’t advertise, preferring to invest every penny into research and product development. The Rega factory is located in Southend-on-Sea, Essex, UK- east of London.

Products
 Turntables (and related components)
 CD players
 Amplifiers
 Loudspeakers
 List of phonograph manufacturers

References

External links

Audio amplifier manufacturers
Compact Disc player manufacturers
Electronics companies established in 1973
Audio equipment manufacturers of the United Kingdom
Headphone amplifier manufacturers
Loudspeaker manufacturers
Phonograph manufacturers
1973 establishments in England

tr:Rega